Alaja may refer to:
 Alaja, Turkmenistan, a populated place
 Pertti Alaja, Finnish footballer

See also 
 Alaca (disambiguation) (pronounced alaja)